Werner Heine (14 August 1935 - 18 June 2022) was a German former footballer who played as a defender.

He played 223 East German top-flight matches. He won the 1959 FDGB-Pokal with SC Dynamo Berlin. Heine won 29 caps for the East Germany national team until 1964.

Managerial career
Heine was assistant manager at BSG Wismut Aue between 1971 and 1974, and manager of BSG Stahl Hennigsdorf from 1984 to 1985.

Notes

References

External links
 
 
 

1935 births
2022 deaths
People from Roßleben
German footballers
East German footballers
Footballers from Thuringia
Association football defenders
East Germany international footballers
DDR-Oberliga players
Berliner FC Dynamo players
1. FC Union Berlin players